SFK Nová Ves nad Váhom is a Slovak football team, based in the town of Nová Ves nad Váhom. The club was founded in 2007.

Current squad

References

External links 
Official club website 

Football clubs in Slovakia
Association football clubs established in 2007
2007 establishments in Slovakia